Vice-Admiral the Honourable Arthur Brandreth Scott Dutton,  (11 September 1876 – 29 September 1932) was a Royal Navy officer who served during World War I, and was Captain-Superintendent of Pembroke Dockyard from 1922 to 1924.

Background
Dutton was the younger son of Colonel Hon. Charles Dutton (1842–1909), by his wife, May Arbuthnot Taylor (1849–1943). He was born in Simla, the summer capital of British India,  where his father was Aide-de-camp to Frederick Roberts, Commander-in-Chief, India.  His father was a younger son of James Henry Legge Dutton, 3rd Baron Sherborne, and his older brother James Dutton (1873–1949) succeeded as Baron Sherborne in 1920, allowing his siblings to use the style the Honourable. His sister Hon. Mabel Honor Dutton was married to Sir George James Robert Clerk of Penicuik, 9th Baronet.

Naval career
Dutton was commissioned in the Royal Navy, where he was promoted to lieutenant in 1898. He was appointed to command of the torpedo boat destroyer HMS Locust in April 1902, while she was serving in the Mediterranean. He participated in the Battle of Jutland, the greatest naval battle of World War I.  In April 1922 he was appointed Captain-Superintendent of Pembroke Dockyard, serving as such until 1924. He was appointed a Naval ADC to King George in 1926, and promoted to rear-admiral later the same year. From 1928 until 1931 he was Commanding Destroyer Flotillas in the Mediterranean Fleet. He retired from the navy as vice-admiral in 1931.

References

1876 births
1932 deaths
Royal Navy vice admirals
Companions of the Order of the Bath
Companions of the Order of St Michael and St George
Royal Navy personnel of World War I